Nguyen Phuc may refer to:
 Nguyên Phúc, a commune in Vietnam.
 Nguyễn Phúc, a Vietnamese royal family